Alex Edward Albert Dowsett (born 3 October 1988) is a former British professional road racing cyclist, who rode for UCI WorldTeam .

Early life
The son of former British Touring Car Championship driver Phil Dowsett, Dowsett was educated at Elm Green Preparatory School in Little Baddow, followed by King Edward VI Grammar School, Chelmsford. He initially took up swimming as a sport, swimming up to five days a week, before starting cycling on a mountain bike along with his father.

Career

Early career
Dowsett began his career at the Maldon and District Cycling Club in the City of Chelmsford. His talent was soon recognised and Dowsett became part of the British Olympic Academy development team. He won the under-23 version of the British Time Trial Championships in 2008 and 2009. In 2010, he rode for American  team and won the under-23 European time trial championship. He also won a silver medal in the Time Trial at the 2010 Commonwealth Games.

Team Sky (2011–12)

Dowsett signed for British-based  as a neo-pro for the 2011 season. His first victory for Sky came in the London Nocturne event. Dowsett finished fifth overall in the Danmark Rundt, helping teammate Simon Gerrans to overall victory. He won the fifth stage of the Tour du Poitou-Charentes to finish second overall. In September, he won the British National Time Trial Championships. Dowsett won the Stage 8a time trial of the Tour of Britain.

In March 2012, Dowsett suffered a broken elbow in the Three Days of De Panne and as a result missed the classics season. Dowsett recovered to finish second in the National Road Race Championships, and later retained his National Time Trial Championships title. Later in September, Dowsett competed at the UCI World Road Race Championships in all three men's elite events, with a best placing of eighth in the individual time trial.

Movistar Team (2013–17)
On 30 October 2012, Dowsett signed with the Spanish  for the 2013 season hoping to gain a ride at a Grand Tour. Dowsett helped  take second place in the team time trial on stage two. On stage eight, a  individual time trial, Dowsett set the fastest time to record his biggest career victory to date, setting a time ten seconds faster than the second placed Bradley Wiggins. In June, Dowsett won the British National Time Trial Championships for the third year in a row despite crashing early on in the course.

In May 2014 Dowsett set a new British 10-mile time trial record in Cambridgeshire, clocking in at 17 minutes 20 seconds and beating Michael Hutchinson's previous record by 25 seconds. Competing for England at the 2014 Commonwealth Games, Dowsett won gold in the Individual Time Trial. After a long breakaway, Dowsett took the lead of the Tour of Britain on the sixth stage but lost it before the end of the race to Dylan van Baarle and finished eighth overall. His team announced that Dowsett had signed a three-year contract extension with them in September.

In December 2014, Dowsett announced he would attempt to break the UCI Hour Record at the Lee Valley VeloPark on 27 February 2015. However, he was forced to postpone the attempt after breaking his collarbone in a training accident. Two weeks later, Dowsett won his first ever stage race, the Bayern Rundfahrt, where he claimed the overall victory a day after winning the Stage 4 individual time-trial. In June 2015 Dowsett clinched his fourth national time trial title. He was named in the start list for the 2015 Tour de France.

Team Katusha–Alpecin (2018–19)
In August 2017, it was announced that Dowsett would join  for the 2018 season. Following the last minute break up of the team in 2019, he initially thought he would rest from professional cycling in 2020 and return to his local Maldon club, to focus on the Olympics and regaining the hour record.

Israel Start-Up Nation (2020–22)
He placed fourth in the time trial at the European Road Championships, and ninth in the time trial at the UCI Road World Championships. Following this, Dowsett contested the Giro d'Italia and won the eighth stage from a six-rider breakaway, soloing to victory from  remaining. Michael Hutchinson coaches Dowsett.

In August 2022, Dowsett announced that he would be retiring from professional cycling at the end of the season.

Personal life
Dowsett suffers from haemophilia and wears a necklace, detailing his medical needs, when out riding. Speaking on ITV's Cycle Show in July 2013, Dowsett cited this medical condition as being a key factor in his choosing competitive cycling in his youth, above other sports, because contact games such as football and rugby were considered too risky. His mother inserted knee and shoulder pads into his school uniform and he wore special trainers.

He is believed to be the only able-bodied elite sportsman or woman with the condition. As a result, he has a special exemption from the Union Cycliste Internationale's no needles policy, introduced in 2011, to inject himself with the clotting protein Factor VIII every 48 hours.

Dowsett started the charitable foundation Little Bleeders to raise awareness of haemophilia and to encourage and support young haemophiliacs to engage with sport. He also has his own YouTube channel, where he documents his life as a professional cyclist.

Major results
Source:

2005
 1st  Time trial, National Junior Road Championships
 1st  Overall Junior Tour of Wales
1st  Mountains classification
2006
 1st  Team pursuit, UEC European Junior Track Championships
 1st  Time trial, National Junior Road Championships
 3rd Overall Junior Tour of Wales
1st  Mountains classification
2007
 6th Rutland–Melton CiCLE Classic
2008
 National Under-23 Road Championships
1st  Time trial
4th Road race
 1st Prologue (TTT) Tour Alsace
2009
 1st  Time trial, National Under-23 Road Championships
 1st Richmond Grand Prix
 7th Time trial, UCI Under-23 Road World Championships
2010
 1st  Time trial, UEC European Under-23 Road Championships
 1st Chrono des Nations Espoirs
 1st Stage 5 Cascade Cycling Classic
 2nd  Time trial, Commonwealth Games
 8th Tour of the Battenkill
2011
 1st  Time trial, National Road Championships
 1st London Nocturne
 1st Stage 8a (ITT) Tour of Britain
 2nd Overall Tour du Poitou-Charentes
1st Stage 5
 3rd Chrono des Nations
 5th Overall Danmark Rundt
 6th Overall Ster ZLM Toer
2012
 National Road Championships
1st  Time trial
2nd Road race
 2nd Duo Normand (with Luke Rowe)
 8th Time trial, UCI Road World Championships
2013
 1st  Time trial, National Road Championships
 1st Stage 8 (ITT) Giro d'Italia
 2nd London Nocturne
2014
 1st  Time trial, Commonwealth Games
 1st Stage 3 (ITT) Circuit de la Sarthe
 2nd  Madison, National Track Championships (with Joe Holt)
 3rd Time trial, National Road Championships
 7th Overall Tour du Poitou-Charentes
 8th Overall Tour of Britain
2015
 World Hour record: 52.937 km
 1st  Time trial, National Road Championships
 1st  Overall Bayern Rundfahrt
1st Stage 4 (ITT)
 3rd  Team time trial, UCI Road World Championships
2016
 1st  Time trial, National Road Championships
 1st Stage 7 (ITT) Tour de Pologne
2017
 1st Stage 2b (ITT) Circuit de la Sarthe
 2nd Time trial, National Road Championships
 10th Overall Dubai Tour
2018
 3rd Time trial, National Road Championships
 5th Time trial, UEC European Road Championships
2019
 National Road Championships
1st  Time trial
4th Road race
 5th Time trial, UCI Road World Championships
 5th Time trial, UEC European Road Championships
 10th Overall ZLM Tour
2020
 1st Stage 8 Giro d'Italia
 4th Time trial, UEC European Road Championships
 9th Time trial, UCI Road World Championships
2021
 1st Stage 1b (TTT) Settimana Internazionale di Coppi e Bartali

Grand Tour general classification results timeline

Championship results timeline

References

External links

 
 
 

 
 
 
 

1988 births
Living people
British Giro d'Italia stage winners
Commonwealth Games gold medallists for England
Commonwealth Games silver medallists for England
Cyclists at the 2010 Commonwealth Games
Cyclists at the 2014 Commonwealth Games
British male cyclists
English male cyclists
People educated at Elm Green Preparatory School
People educated at King Edward VI Grammar School, Chelmsford
People from Maldon, Essex
People with haemophilia
Commonwealth Games medallists in cycling
Sportspeople from Essex
21st-century British people
Medallists at the 2010 Commonwealth Games
Medallists at the 2014 Commonwealth Games